Pioneer Trail is a 1938 American Western film directed by Joseph Levering and starring Jack Luden, Joan Barclay and Slim Whitaker.

Cast
 Jack Luden as Breezy
 Joan Barclay as Alice Waite
 Slim Whitaker as Curley 
 Leon Beaumon as Henchman Joe
 Hal Taliaferro as Henchman Smokey
 Marin Sais as Belle
 Eva McKenzie as Ma Allen
 Hal Price as Baron Waite
 Dick Botiller as Pedro
 Tom London as Sam Harden

References

Bibliography
 Pitts, Michael R. Western Movies: A Guide to 5,105 Feature Films. McFarland, 2012.

External links
 

1938 films
1938 Western (genre) films
American Western (genre) films
Films directed by Joseph Levering
American black-and-white films
Columbia Pictures films
1930s English-language films
1930s American films